Thereselia modesta is a species of beetle in the family Cerambycidae, and the only species in the genus Thereselia. It was described by Pic in 1946.

References

Desmiphorini
Beetles described in 1946
Monotypic beetle genera